Polygamous unions are legal in the United Arab Emirates Muslim polygamy, in practice and law, differs greatly throughout the Islamic world. In some Muslim countries, polygamy is relatively common, while in most others, it is often rare or non-existent. Polygamy is most widely practiced by Muslims in West Africa (where it is also widely practiced by non-Muslims), as well as in certain traditionalist Arabian states such as Saudi Arabia and the United Arab Emirates.

As with polygyny in Islam in general, men are allowed up to four wives, and women are not permitted multiple husbands.

References

Society of the United Arab Emirates
Family law in the United Arab Emirates
Marriage, unions and partnerships in the United Arab Emirates
United Arab
Women's rights in the United Arab Emirates